Terry London Rinehart is an American airline pilot. When she was hired by Western Airlines in 1976, she was the first woman pilot to fly for them and one of 10 women working as airline pilots in the United States.

Biography 
Rinehart grew up in Long Beach, California in a family of aviators. Rinehart's mother, Barbara London, was a Women Airforce Service Pilot (WASP).

Rinehart graduated from San Jose State University (SJSU) in 1974. In 1976, she was hired by Western Airlines, becoming the first woman airline pilot to work at the company. At the time, she was one of 10 women who worked as pilots in airlines based in the United States. She went on to fly as a captain for Delta Air Lines after it purchased Western Airlines. She started flying the Boeing 737, and later flew the 757 and 767. Rinehart also has a helicopter pilots license and is a Whirly Girl. Rinehart's husband, Bob Rinehart, is also a pilot, and their three children later went into the aviation field.

References

External links 
Terry Rinehart (2010 video)

Delta Air Lines people
People from Long Beach, California
American aviators
Helicopter pilots
San Jose State University alumni
Year of birth missing (living people)
Living people